Paul G. Socken (born 1945) is a professor emeritus at the University of Waterloo in Waterloo, Ontario, Canada and a leading scholar on the work of French-Canadian author Gabrielle Roy.  He is also the founder of the department of Jewish Studies at the University of Waterloo.

Socken holds a B.A. and a Ph.D. (1974) from the University of Toronto.  He is a specialist in French-Canadian literature, particularly in the novel. He has done research on the thematic and stylistic aspects of Gabrielle Roy's writing and currently publishes in the area of mythology and French-Canadian literature.

Currently, Socken is an occasional columnist for the Canadian Jewish News.

Works

Books 
 The Edge of the Precipice: Why Read Literature in the Digital Age? (2013)
 Why Study Talmud in the Twenty-First Century?: The Relevance of the Ancient Jewish Text to Our World (2009)
 Intimate Strangers (2004)
 Gabrielle Roy Today / Gabrielle Roy aujourd'hui (2003)
 The French They Never Taught You (with José Binamé) (2002)
 Patrimoines: La Francophonie en Amérique du nord (with P.H. Dubé and Ann Dubé) (1992)
 The Myth of the Lost Paradise in the Novels of Jacques Poulin (1993)
 Concordance de Bonheur d'occasion de Gabrielle Roy (1982)
 Myth and Morality in Alexandre Chenevert by G. Roy (1987)

Chapters/Articles in Books
 "Gabrielle Roy: An Annotated Bibliography" The Annotated Bibliography of Canada's Major Authors (1979)

Selected Professional and Community Affiliations
 Association of Quebec and Canadian Studies
 Association of Canadian Studies in the United States
 Association française d'études canadiennes

See also
 List of University of Waterloo people

References
Profile at University of Waterloo.

Canadian literary critics
1945 births
Living people